Hale Smith (June 29, 1925 – November 24, 2009) was an American composer, arranger, and pianist.

Biography
Born in Cleveland, Ohio, he learned piano at an early age and played mellophone in the high school band. As a teenager, he played jazz piano in local nightclubs. When he was sixteen, he met Duke Ellington, who commented on his compositions.

In the early 1940s he was drafted and worked for the U.S. Army as an arranger for shows at camps in Georgia and Florida. After the Army he studied classical music and composition at the Cleveland Institute of Music and received bachelor's and master's degrees. His composition Four Songs won the first student composer award given by BMI. During the late 1950s he moved to New York City and was employed as an editor at publishing companies. He worked as a jazz pianist and arranger with Eric Dolphy, Dizzy Gillespie, Ahmad Jamal, Melba Liston, Oliver Nelson, and Randy Weston and wrote incidental music for television, radio, and theater.  With Chico Hamilton he wrote music for the movie Mr. Ricco (1975).

His compositions include The Valley Wind (1952), In Memoriam, Beryl Rubinstein (1953), Sonata for Cello and Piano (1955), Contours for Orchestra (1961), Faces of Jazz (1965), Evocation (1966), Ritual and Incantation (1974), Innerflexions (1977), Toussaint L'Ouverture (1979), Solemn Music (1979),  Three Patterson Lyrics (1985), and Dialogues and Commentaries (1991) He wrote music for band, choir, orchestra, jazz groups, chamber ensembles, duos, and solo performance.

Smith was a teacher at C.W. Post campus of Long Island University in Brookville and the University of Connecticut in Storrs. He died at the age of 84 on November 24, 2009, due to a stroke.

Award and honors
 Cleveland Art Prize in Music, 1973
 Outstanding Achievement Award, National Association for the Study and Performance of African American Music, 1982
 Honorary doctorate, Cleveland Institute of Music, 1988
 Composer's Recording Award, American Academy of Arts and Letters, 1988
 Letter of Distinction, American Music Center, 2001
 Hale Smith Day, Freeport, New York, 2010

Compositions
 Orchestral Set (1952)
 Four Songs for Medium Voice (1952)
 The Valley Wind (1952)
 In Memoriam – Beryl Rubinstein (1953)
 Sonata for Violoncello and Piano (1955)
 Two Love Songs of John Donne (1958)
 Feathers (1960)
 Contours for Orchestra (1961)
 Take a Chance: An Aleatoric Episode (1964)
 By Yearning and by Beautiful (1964)
 Evocation (1966)
 Expansions (1967)
 Music for Harp and Chamber Orchestra (1967)
 Trinal Dance (1968)
 I Love Music (c. 1970) – recorded by Betty Carter, Joe Lovano,
 Beyond the Rim of Day (1970)
 Exchanges (1972)
 Somersault: A Twelve Tone Adventure (1974)
 Ritual and Incantation (1974)
 Variations for Six Players (1975)
 Innerflexions (1977)
 Solemn Music (1979)
 Toussaint L'Ouverture, 1803 (1979)
 Meditations in Passage (1982)
 Variations a' Due for saxophone and cello (1984, rev.1995), recorded by Dr. Ira Wiggins and Dr. Timothy Holley
 March and Fanfare for an Elegant Lady (1986)
 Dialogues & Commentaries (1990–91)
 Recitative and Aria (1995)

References

 Breda, Malcolm Joseph. (1975). Hale Smith: A Biographical and Analytical Study of the Man and His Music. Ph.D. dissertation, University of Southern Mississippi.
 Caldwell, Hansonia La Verne (1975). "Conversation With Hale Smith, A Man of Many Parts." The Black Perspective in Music, vol. 3, no. 1, pp. 59–76 (spring 1975).

External links
Hale Smith's page at Theodore Presser Company
Hale Smith page
Hale Smith tribute

1925 births
2009 deaths
20th-century African-American musicians
20th-century American composers
20th-century American male musicians
20th-century American pianists
20th-century classical composers
20th-century classical pianists
21st-century African-American musicians
21st-century American composers
21st-century American male musicians
21st-century American pianists
21st-century classical composers
21st-century classical pianists
African-American classical composers
American classical composers
African-American classical pianists
African-American jazz pianists
African-American male classical composers
African-American opera composers
American classical pianists
American male classical composers
American male classical pianists
American male jazz musicians
Classical musicians from Ohio
Cleveland Institute of Music alumni
Jazz musicians from Ohio
Male opera composers
Musicians from Cleveland
University of Connecticut faculty
United States Army personnel of World War II